Arpiar Aslanian (16 December 1895 – 15 February 1945) was a French anti-fascist of Armenian descent, communist, husband of the writer Louise Aslanian, and a prominent figure in the French Resistance.

Early life 

Arpiar Levonovich Aslanian was born on 16 December 1895 in Etchmiadzin, (Russian Armenia) in the family of Levon and Varvara Aslanians. He had an older brother, Derenik, and a sister — Arpik. His father, Levon, was a principal in a school and also worked in the Etchmiadzin monastery, where he was in charge of the library collections.

Aslanian received a juridical education in Tsarist Russia and became a lawyer.

Aslanian was a member of the Dashnaktsutyun. He had to leave Armenia to avoid prosecution by Bolsheviks.
Aslanian travelled to Tabriz, where in 1923 he married Louise Grigorian, more than ten years younger than him.

Life in France 

In 1923, the couple moved to Paris, taking with them Mania and Arshaluys (Louise's mother and sister, respectively). In Paris Louise wanted to continue her musical education playing piano. In order to let her do that, Aslanian, an educated lawyer, who was unable to practice in a foreign country, became a general laborer.

In 1940 Aslanian joined the French Communist Party.

French Resistance 
After the Nazis occupied France, the Aslanians joined the French Resistance in 1940. The Aslanians worked in an underground publishing house and actively engaged in supplying fighters of the French Resistance with weapons.
Aslanians had connections with Resistance activists : Missak Manouchian, Mélinée Manouchian, Arpen Tavitian, Ayk Dpirian, Shag Taturian and others.

Arrest, concentration camp, death 
On 26 July 1944 both Aslanians were arrested in France by the Nazis. Louise's diaries and manuscripts were captured and destroyed, in particular,  «Histoire de la Resistance» and «La Chute de Paris».

On 15 August 1944, they were taken from Toulouse to Buchenwald. Arpiar was then transferred to the camp Dora-Mittelbau, while Louise was taken to Ravensbrück.

On 15 February 1945, Aslanian, was killed at camp Dora-Mittelbau.
Louise Aslanian was killed presumably in Ravensbrück after 2 February 1945.

See also 
 Armenians in France

References

External links 
  Armenians in French Resistance
 Arolsen archives of nazi concentration camps
 Arméniens Morts pour la France

1895 births
1945 deaths
Armenian communists
Executed activists
French people of Armenian descent
Communist members of the French Resistance
Armenian people of World War II
Resistance members who died in Nazi concentration camps
Armenian people executed by Nazi Germany
French people executed by Nazi Germany
People who died in Mittelbau-Dora concentration camp
French civilians killed in World War II
Soviet emigrants to France